The Ripon Society is an American centrist Republican public policy organization and think tank based in Washington, D.C. It publishes The Ripon Forum, the U.S.'s longest running Republican thought and opinion journal, as well as The Ripon Advance, a daily news publication.

Founded in 1962 in Cambridge, Massachusetts, the Society's name comes from the 1854 birthplace of the Republican Party—Ripon, Wisconsin. Its main goals are to promote the following American ideas and principles: national security, low taxes, and a federal government that is smaller, smarter and more accountable to the people.

The Ripon Society was the first major Republican organization to support passage of the Civil Rights Act in the 1960s. In 1967, it advanced the concept of the "Negative Income Tax" as a means of ameliorating poverty in the U.S. with the simple expedient of the government's providing cash payments to families in need. The society's paper stated the program would help families rise up the income ladder, moving them from payment recipients to working taxpayers. In the early 1970s, it called for the normalization of relations with China, and the abolition of the military draft.

History

Founding

Emil Frankel and the Bow Group
Emil Frankel was a Harvard law student in the early 1960s. He had studied in England on a Fulbright scholarship. While in England, he met members of a group called the Bow Group. The Bow Group founders had been "dissatisfied with the Conservative Party's image as 'the Stupid Party'." The Bow Group impressed Frankel, particularly regarding the level of detail that its members applied to study public policy problems and the proactive way its members became experts on policy topics.

At the same time John S. Saloma III was a professor at Massachusetts Institute of Technology. Like Frankel, Saloma had studied in England on a Fulbright scholarship. Both Frankel and Saloma became editors at Advance magazine.

In December 1962, Frankel and Saloma "circulated a confidential 'Proposal for an American Bow Group'". Saloma and Frankel held a meeting on December 12, 1962, in Cambridge, Massachusetts at Harvard College. The meeting would become the first meeting of the group that eventually became known as the Ripon Society. The name is a reference to Ripon, Wisconsin, the informal birthplace of the Republican Party. (The town's claim was disputed by Jackson, Michigan, where the first official meeting of the Party was held; but a Republican organization was unlikely to name itself "The Jackson Society").

The society's meetings took place monthly at locations around Harvard. Some sixty individuals attended at least one Ripon meeting during its first year, and about half became active members. Most were graduate or professionals students and young professors from Harvard, M.I.T., and the Fletcher School of Law and Diplomacy at Tufts. The members of the Ripon Society were primarily middle-class, and a majority of members were from the Midwest.

One of the main goals of the Ripon Society is to promote ideas and principles that have contributed to the GOP's past success. These ideas include keeping the nation secure, keeping taxes low and having a federal government that is not just smaller, but smarter and more accountable to the people.

A Call to History
On November 22, 1963, a group of Ripon Society members were having lunch in a dining hall at Harvard University. During lunch, they were planning a trip to campaign for Nelson Rockefeller for president, who was at that time the Republican governor of New York. Near the end of their lunch meeting, the members got word that President John F. Kennedy had been shot.

Political historian and author Geoffrey Kabaservice writes, "Although they (the Ripon Society members) were Republicans, JFK had been their political inspiration. When the news confirmed that Kennedy had been killed, they were caught between grief for their fallen hero and fear of Lyndon Johnson, who succeeded to the presidency".

Over the weeks following Kennedy's death, the Ripon members wrote a manifesto, "A Call to Excellence in Leadership: An Open Letter to the New Generation of Republicans." Newspapers around the U.S. published highlights of the manifesto. The New York Herald Tribune published it in full. The media attention given to the "Call to Excellence" thrust Ripon onto the national stage. The Washington Star was one newspaper that editorially hailed the Society as "a new voice in the land ... a voice that ought to be heeded."

Another voice was President (and Republican) Dwight Eisenhower, who wrote "my delight that an obviously intelligent group of people has taken the trouble to voice its consensus on this important subject, and also to express my basic agreement in the mainstream of its thinking."

The Ripon Papers

The Ripon Society wrote its first public statement in the weeks that followed Kennedy's assassination and published the statement on January 6, 1964:

While we yet sorrow, so must we seize this moment before our thoughts slip away to be lost in the noise of 'life as usual.' It is in this context that we have chosen to speak. We speak as a group of young Republicans to that generation which must bear the responsibility for guiding our party and our country over the coming decades. We speak for a point of view in the Republican Party that has too long been silent.

We believe that the future of our party lies not in extremism, but in moderation. The moderate course offers the Republican Party the best chance to build a durable majority position in American politics. This is the direction the party must take if it is to win the confidence of the "new Americans" who are not at home in the politics of another generation: the new middle classes of the suburbs of the North and West – who have left the Democratic cities but have not yet found a home in the Republican party; the young college graduates and professional men and women of our great university centers – more concerned with "opportunity" than "security", the moderate of the new South – who represent the hope for peaceful racial adjustment and who are insulted by a racist appeal more fitting another generation. These and others like them hold the key to the future of our politics.

We believe that the Republican Party should accept the challenge to fight for the middle ground of American politics. The party that will not acknowledge this political fact of life and courageously enter the contest for power does not merit and cannot possibly win the majority support of the American people.

John Saloma, founding president

The first president of the society was John S. Saloma III, serving from 1963 until 1967. In 1962, Saloma founded the American Bow Group, a society of university intellectuals. In 1963, the American Bow Group became the Ripon Society.

Saloma attended MIT and the London School of Economics. He received his doctorate from Harvard University with his dissertation "British Conservatism and the Welfare State".

In his career, Saloma's work focused mainly on the American political party system. Participating in a project studying the U.S. Congress sponsored by the American Political Science Association and the Carnegie Foundation, he published Congress and the New Politics in 1969 which dealt with the workloads in the offices of members of Congress. This led to an interest in the congressional budget process and the possibilities of computer use in the daily job of a representative. He died on July 6, 1983 in San Francisco, California.

Other founding members include Tom Petri, a U.S. congressman, and Lee Huebner.

Former leaders
 Auspitz, Josiah Lee
 Frenzel, Bill. Chairman Emeritus. Former U.S. Congressman.
 Dubke, Michael
 Gerstell, Glenn S.
 Gillette, Howard F. National president from 1971–1972.
 Huebner, Lee. Co-founder and former president. Former special assistant to President Nixon.
 Kellogg, Frederick R.
 Kessler, Rick. From 2004 to 2009, Rick Kessler served as the Ripon Society's president. When he retired from the position in 2009, he became the group's president emeritus. Kessler began working for the group in 1981 as the executive director. Previously, he worked on the presidential campaign of John Anderson and served on the inaugural committee for newly elected President Ronald Reagan in 1980–1981.
 Leach, Jim. U.S. Congressman from Iowa.
 Petri, Tom. U.S. Congressman from Wisconsin. Co-founder.
 Saloma III, John S. Founding President.
 Smith, Peter, U.S. Congressman from Vermont.

1964 Presidential campaign
A Slate article in 1998 attributed the Ripon's founding, in part, to "Republicans put off by the vulgarity of the Goldwater campaign ..." In 1964, conservative activists within the Republican Party nominated Barry Goldwater for president. The Ripon Society argued against Goldwater, writing:We believe that the future of our party lies not in extremism, but in moderation. The moderate course offers the Republican Party the best chance to build a durable majority position in American politics. This is the direction the party must take if it is to win the confidence of the 'new Americans' who are not at home in the politics of another generation: the new middle classes of the suburbs of the North and West – who have left the Democratic cities but have not yet found a home in the Republican party; the young college graduates and professional men and women of our great university centers – more concerned with 'opportunity' than 'security'; the moderates of the new South – who represent the hope for peaceful racial adjustment and who are insulted by a racist appeal more fitting another generation. These and others like them hold the key to the future of our politics.

Journals and publications

Ripon Forum
The Ripon Forum, a magazine that features articles from a variety of contributors, is published quarterly by the Ripon Society. It has been described as "... the only national magazine expressing a progressive Republican view."

Ripon Advance
The Ripon Advance is a daily publication that provides news and information about public policy and highlights the work of state and federal elected officials.

Summary of major historical events

Ripon Society and Federal Election Commission
In 2004, the Ripon Society requested a legal advisory opinion from the Federal Election Commission (FEC). Ripon wanted to pay for a TV campaign commercial in favor of the re-election of Congresswoman Sue Kelly (R-NY). Ripon's argument in favor of being allowed to run the commercial was that the commercial would promote homeland security policies that the Ripon Society, and Congresswoman Kelly, supported.

The requested advisory opinion amounted to a request for an interpretation of the Federal Election Campaign Act of 1971 as it applied to the specific details of the proposed campaign advertisement.

The FEC responded by saying that the law prohibited Ripon from paying for the ad if it was televised within Congresswoman Kelly's congressional district. However, the FEC said that Ripon could pay for the ad if it were televised outside of her district and only if the Ripon Society did not coordinate with Republican Party officials.

In FEC Advisory Opinion 2004-33, the FEC said the Ripon Society could not legally pay for a political TV commercial for a congressional candidate if it was aired in the candidate's district immediately before an election (30 days before a primary election or 60 days before a general election). At that time (2004), the law prohibited corporate funds from paying for "electioneering communication", an umbrella term that includes campaign TV commercials.

Republican of the Year Award
In addition to George H. W. Bush, other Republican of the Year recipients have included former Senator Bob Dole and former Senator Howard H. Baker Jr.

Programs

Lecture series
The Ripon Society hosts a series of lectures known as their "Policy & Politics Dialogue Series", which in 2011 has consisted of over 40 idea-based forums. Speakers have included: Speaker of the House John Boehner, Representatives Kevin Brady and Greg Walden, Senators Rob Portman and John McCain, former Secretary of Defense Donald Rumsfeld, and Republican National Committee Chairman Reince Priebus. At a Ripon event in January 2013, shortly after President Obama's second inaugural address, Boehner told the audience that President Obama was trying to "annihilate the Republican Party."

Breakfast series
The Ripon Society hosts breakfast forums that feature members of Congress. For example, the breakfast forums have hosted the Republican Women's Policy Committee, National Republican Senatorial Committee, and House Ways and Means Committee members.

Rough Rider awards
Between 1999 and 2004, the Society gave what was known as the Rough Rider Awards to recognize public officeholders who have "'stood in the arena, and pushed for innovative policy solutions on a range of issues." Notable recipients included former Wisconsin Governor and Secretary of Health and Human Services Tommy Thompson, future House Speaker John Boehner, and White House Chief of Staff Andrew H. Card.

Bipartisan action
This section summarizes some of the bipartisan legislation and actions led by Members of Congress who sit on Ripon's congressional advisory board.

Superbugs, nightmare bacteria and the FDA
Senator Orrin Hatch (R-UT), a member of the Ripon congressional advisory board, along with Senator Michael Bennet (D-CO) introduced a bill in January 2015 known as the PATH Act. The bill would change the drug approval process for antibiotic drugs that fight "combat resistant bacteria". These types of bacteria, also known as "superbugs", don't respond to antibiotic medication. The Centers for Disease Control says that 23,000 people in the U.S. die each year from these types of bacteria.

Congressional Advisory Board

The advisory board also includes the following retired Members of Congress:

 Bill Archer (TX)
 Henry Bonilla (TX)
 Michael Castle (DE)
 Geoff Davis (KY)
 Mike Ferguson (NJ)
 David Hobson (OH)
 Nancy Johnson (CT)
 Sue Kelly (NY)
 Scott Klug (WI)
 Bob Livingston (LA)
 Jim McCrery (LA)
 Robert H. Michel (IL)
 Susan Molinari (NY)
 Don Nickles (OK)
 Bill Paxon (NY)
 Deborah Pryce (OH)
 Tom Reynolds (NY)
 Tom Ridge (PA)
 Gordon Smith (OR)
 Don Sundquist (TN)
 Tom Tauke (IA)
 Robert Walker (PA)

Source: Ripon Society website.

Legal information
The Ripon Society is a 501(c)(4) incorporated non-profit social welfare organization. The current Ripon Society logo is trademarked. The trademark describes the logo: "The mark consists in part of a stylized depiction of an elephant." Ripon filed the trademark application on May 9, 2002 with the U.S. Patent and Trademark Office.

Historical bibliography

1960–1969
 
 Gillette, Howard F. "Ripon Society records, 1963-1978". Collection Number 2824. Division of Rare and Manuscript Collections (New York, NY: Cornell University Library). "Includes correspondence, research projects, civil rights material, reports, fund raising material, programs, minutes of meetings, financial records, memoranda, press releases, newsletters, publications, correspondence and other material related to various Republican organizations, mailings to potential contributors and subscribers, membership records, research materials and papers, clippings, and other records of the Ripon Society. Also records of the Ripon Society collected by Howard F. Gillette, Jr."
  Digitized 16 August 2011

1970–1979
 Auspitz, Josiah Lee (1 March 1970.)  Commentary Magazine.
 
  Digitized 13 May 2010.

1980–1989

1990–1999

2000–2009

2010–

References

External links

 Official website
 The Ripon Forum past editions
 The Ripon Advance, the official newspaper of the Ripon Society
 Ripon Society historical news archives at The New York Times
 Ripon Society events recorded on C-SPAN

Political and economic think tanks in the United States
Republican Party (United States) organizations
Centrism in the United States
Centrist political advocacy groups in the United States
Non-profit organizations based in Washington, D.C.